Abdolali Bazargan (born 14 August 1943 in Tehran, Iran) is an Iranian liberal politician, writer and intellectual who is current deputy leader of Freedom Movement of Iran. He was one of five major figures in the Green Movement to author a manifesto calling for the resignation of Iranian President Mahmoud Ahmadinejad in 2009.

Early life
He was born on 14 August 1943 in Tehran. He is the son of Mehdi Bazargan, Iran's first prime minister following the Iranian Revolution in 1979. He is married and has three children.

Political life
He joined the National Front of Iran in 1961 but in 1963 he left party and joined to his father's established party Freedom Movement in 1977.

References
official website

Living people
1943 births
Iranian reformists
Freedom Movement of Iran politicians
Politicians from Tehran
National Front (Iran) student activists
Movement of Militant Muslims politicians
Members of the Association for Defense of Freedom and the Sovereignty of the Iranian Nation